Harpal Singh (born 11 October 1983) is a former Indian field hockey player who played as a defender for the national team. He was part of the Indian team that competed at the 2004 Summer Olympics. He was born in Sirsa

References

External links
 
Player profile at bharatiyahockey.org

1983 births
Living people
People from Sirsa, Haryana
Indian male field hockey players
Field hockey players from Haryana
Field hockey players at the 2004 Summer Olympics
Olympic field hockey players of India
Field hockey players at the 2006 Asian Games
Asian Games competitors for India